Lonette Rita McKee (born July 22, 1954) is an American actress. She is best known for her role as Sister Williams in the original 1976 musical-drama film Sparkle. McKee also had notable roles in such movies as The Cotton Club, Jungle Fever, ATL and Honey.

Biography

Early life and education 
Born in Detroit, Michigan, McKee was the second of three daughters of Dorothy McKee, of Swedish descent, and Lonnie McKee, an African American bricklayer and auto manufacturer employee. McKee's older sister, Katherine "Kathy" McKee, is also an actress and performer. McKee attended St Martin De Porres High School, but dropped out after her freshman year, moving to Los Angeles, California, to live with her older sister.

Career 
McKee's career began in the music business in Detroit as a child prodigy, where she started writing music/lyrics, singing, playing keyboards and performing at the age of seven. In 1968, McKee, then aged 14, recorded her first record entitled "Don't Worry About It". It became an instant regional pop/R&B hit. McKee wrote the title song for the film Quadroon, in which her sister Katherine McKee starred, when she was fifteen.

Several years later, McKee was launched to stardom with her critically acclaimed performance in the hit 1976 musical drama film Sparkle. She has written and produced three solo LPs. Natural Love was produced for Spike Lee's Columbia 40 Acres and A Mule label in 1992. Ed Hogan, reviewing for AllMusic, wrote, "'Natural Love' shows that the singer/songwriter's muse knows no stylistic bounds. As with her earlier effort, McKee co-writes all of the songs while sharing production credits with Bryant McNeil, Gene Lake Jr., and labelmate Raymond Jones of State of Art." McKee scored the music for the well-received cable documentary on the Lower Manhattan African Burial Ground, as well as numerous infomercials. McKee has toured extensively throughout the world singing concert performances, including the JVC Jazz Festival at Carnegie Hall. McKee studied film directing at The New School in New York and apprenticed directing with the filmmaker Spike Lee. McKee also studied singing with Dini Clark and ballet with Sarah Tayir, both in Los Angeles. She also appeared on the CW sitcom The Game as Mrs. Pitts, the mother of Jason (played by Coby Bell), in 2007.

McKee won critical acclaim for her Broadway debut performance in the musical The First in 1981, co-starring in the role of Jackie Robinson's wife Rachel. She became the first African American to play the coveted role of Julie in the Houston Grand Opera's production of Show Boat in 1983 on Broadway, for which she received a Tony Award nomination for Best Actress in a Musical. McKee's tragic portrayal of jazz legend Billie Holiday in the one-woman drama with music, Lady Day at Emerson's Bar and Grill, won critical acclaim, standing ovations, and a 1987 Drama Desk Award nomination (Outstanding Actress in a Musical). She reprised the role of Julie on Broadway in the 1994 revival of Show Boat directed by Hal Prince.

In 2013, McKee expressed a desire to establish a performance arts center in the New York tri-state area. She performs her one-woman memoir with music on stages throughout the US. She produced her first feature film, Dream Street, which she wrote and directed.

Personal life 
McKee has been married once and has no children. She dated the actor and stand-up comedian Freddie Prinze for a time during 1976. McKee was married to Leo Compton, a youth counselor, from February 1983 to 1990. In the mid-1990s, she lived in an Upper East Side brownstone with her companion, the musician Bryant McNeil. They met while they were working together on McKee's Natural Love album. McKee teaches a master acting workshop at Centenary College of New Jersey, where she is an adjunct professor in the Theater Arts department.

Discography 
 Lonette (Sussex, 1974)
 Words and Music (Warner Bros., 1978)
 Natural Love (40 Acres and a Mule/Columbia, 1992)

Filmography

References

External links 

 Lonette McKee official website

African-American actresses
American people of Swedish descent
American film actresses
American musical theatre actresses
American soap opera actresses
American television actresses
Living people
Actresses from Detroit
People from New Jersey
1954 births
20th-century African-American women singers
21st-century African-American people
21st-century African-American women